The London Challenge Cup was a football tournament formerly organised by the London FA. It was first contested in 1908, and other than during the World Wars, was contested every season until 1974, when the tournament was disbanded.

After a 16-year hiatus, the tournament was resurrected in 1990–91, but only lasted 10 years before being once again discontinued.

In its original guise, the tournament was won by most of the major professional clubs in London such as Arsenal, Chelsea, Tottenham Hotspur and West Ham United, but the quality of entrants after the revival was lower, with all the winners except Leyton Orient in 1992–93 being non-League clubs.

Results of finals
Results of finals during the initial period

Results of finals during the revived period

External links
 London Challenge Cup

References

County Cup competitions
Football competitions in London
Recurring sporting events established in 1908
Recurring sporting events disestablished in 2000
Defunct football cup competitions in England
1908 establishments in England